The Bishop of Willochra is the diocesan bishop of the Anglican Diocese of Willochra, Australia.

On 29 October 2022, the diocese elected Jeremy James, formerly assistant bishop in the Anglican Diocese of Perth, as its next bishop, replacing John Stead who had retired on 2 July 2022. Bishop Jeremy James was installed on 25 February 2023.

List of Bishops of Willochra
References

External links

 – official site

 
Lists of Anglican bishops and archbishops
Anglican bishops of Willochra